Rachid Abdellah El Moudene (born February 11, 1994) is an Algerian footballer who plays as a midfielder for IR Tanger.

References

External links
 
 

1994 births
Algerian footballers
Algerian expatriate footballers
Algerian expatriate sportspeople in France
Algerian Ligue Professionnelle 1 players
Championnat National players
Expatriate footballers in France
DRB Tadjenanet players
MC Alger players
Paradou AC players
Paris FC players
RC Arbaâ players
MC Oran players
Footballers from Oran
Living people
Association football midfielders
21st-century Algerian people